Kalvanin Kadhali is a 2006 Indian Tamil-language romantic comedy film written and directed by newcomer Tamilvannan, and produced by Lakshman. The film stars S. J. Suryah and Nayanthara with Shraddha Arya in lead roles with Pyramid Natarajan, Vivek and Ganja Karuppu playing supporting roles. It is notably, Suryah's first film as the hero, which hasn't been directed by himself. The film was a high-budget production, the soundtrack and film score of which were composed by Yuvan Shankar Raja, which were considered the highlight and as a great hit, especially the soundtrack. This love story is set in the backdrop of a playboy's tricks. The film was released on 17 February 2006 enjoying relative success.

Plot
Sathya is a casanova and pursues Tina. Later, he sets his sights on Haritha and manages to woo her. She starts loving him wholeheartedly, but he is not in favor of that. At one moment he falls for Haritha, but at the same time, she discovers his real character, and ends their relationship. The story is about how Sathya changes himself and earns her love back.

Cast

Production
The film was initially launched with the title 36-24-36, while Krishna Leelai was also considered, before the makers decided to use Kalvanin Kadhali, derived from the novel of the same name.

Soundtrack

The soundtrack was composed by Yuvan Shankar Raja and was released on 29 November 2005 at Albert Theatre, Chennai by actor Kamal Haasan. It features 6 tracks with lyrics written by Na. Muthukumar, 'Kavignar' Vaali and Muthu Vijayan. Yuvan Shankar Raja's music generally received praise and positive responses, topping the charts.

Reception
Sify said, "This love story has the Suryah stamp of humour and is sure to satisfy his fans, who enjoy his smutty comedies". The Hindu wrote, "That Suryah is honing his skills as an actor, is evident. The increasing spontaneity in his expressions is heartening. But it is hard to swallow the contrived emotions when he tries to fool the heroine's people".

References

External links
 

2006 films
2000s Tamil-language films
Films scored by Yuvan Shankar Raja